Reactive may refer to:

Generally, capable of having a reaction (disambiguation)
An adjective abbreviation denoting a bowling ball coverstock made of reactive resin
Reactivity (chemistry)
Reactive mind
Reactive programming

See also
Reactance (disambiguation)
Reactivity (disambiguation)